Emmanuel Ohene Boafo (born 4 July 1993) is a Dutch-Ghanaian actor. He plays the Dutch voice of Black Panther in the What if...? animation series and in 2021 he became the first black actor to win the prestigious Louis d'Or, for his version of the monologue Sea Wall. He was born in a Ghanaian family in the town of Meppel in the Netherlands.

Early life

As a child he played the drums, but after seeing the play Backfire by youth theatre group Jong Rast, he wanted to become an actor. His parents were immigrants from Ghana.

Acting career
His acting career started when he joined Jong Rast, lead by artistic director Elike Roovers. To avoid a conflict with his father, he had promised to quit acting after a performance in the play I don't care, but was eventually cast for a role in the film Exit. The 2013 production awarded him a Golden Calf, and marked a change in his father's attitude. The following year, he was accepted to the Dutch theater school Toneelacademie Maastricht, which he attended from 2014 to 2018. During his studies, he did an internship at Het Nationale Theater (HNT), where he had a conflict with the director about his role in Meanwhile in Casblanca. He viewed his role as too "role-affirming." Despite the conflict, he was able to join the theater group after graduation. He appeared on stage in The reunification of the two Koreas by Eric de Vroedt, Cinema by Jeroen de Man, The world according to John, Sexual Healing and Trojan Wars, the latter performed by HNTjong. He won the Guido de Moor Prize in 2017.

From 2021 he played the role of war veteran Richard Mehciz in BNNVARA's drama series Thuisfront. He also played guest roles in the series Toon, De Maatschap, A'dam - E.V.A., Papadag and the movie The Paradise Suite. He played the Dutch voice for T'Challa in the animation series What If...?. The same year, he won the Louis d'Or, for his version of the monologue Seawall, which he performed in English. In the same year he decided to quit the HNT to focus on film and television roles. In 2022 he voiced Knuckles in the adventure film Sonic the Hedgehog 2.

Awards
Boafo won the following awards:

External links 
Boafo's IMDB profile

References

Dutch actors
Dutch people of Ghanaian descent
Actors from Amsterdam
1993 births
Living people